Chubdar-e Pain (also Romanized as Chūbdār-e Pā’īn and Chūbdār Pā’īn; also known as Chūbdar-e Soflá) is a village in Zhan Rural District, in the Central District of Dorud County, Lorestan Province, Iran. At the 2006 census, its population was 90, in 22 families.

References 

Towns and villages in Dorud County